Edgar Martirosovich Sevikyan (born 8 August 2001) is a Russian professional footballer who plays as a left winger for Pari Nizhny Novgorod.

Club career
Born in Moscow with Armenian descent, Sevikyan joined Levante UD's youth setup in 2017 from FC Lokomotiv Moscow, after travelling to the city of Valencia to visit his mother, sister and brother. On 22 June 2019, while still a youth, he signed his first professional contract after agreeing to a three-year deal.

Sevikyan made his senior debut with the reserves on 19 January 2020, coming on as a second-half substitute for Álex Blesa in a 0–1 Segunda División B away loss against CE Sabadell FC. He was handed his first start seven days later, and scored his team's second in a 3–1 away defeat of Hércules CF.

Sevikyan made his professional – and La Liga – debut on 5 December 2020, replacing goalscorer Jorge de Frutos late into a 3–0 home win against Getafe CF.

On 6 July 2022, Sevikyan signed a three-year contract with Russian Premier League club Pari Nizhny Novgorod. He made his RPL debut for Pari NN on 9 October 2022 against FC Torpedo Moscow.

International career
Sevikyan represented Russia from the under-15 to the under-20 levels. It is still unclear where Sevikyan will play in his senior national career. Having talks with both the Armenian and Russian federations he stated that he still needs time to decide.

He made his debut for Russian under-21 team on 3 September 2021 in a Under-21 Euro qualifier against Spain that Russia lost 1–4.

Career statistics

References

External links

2001 births
Footballers from Moscow
Russian people of Armenian descent
Living people
Russian footballers
Russia youth international footballers
Russia under-21 international footballers
Association football wingers
Atlético Levante UD players
Levante UD footballers
FC Nizhny Novgorod (2015) players
La Liga players
Segunda División B players
Russian Premier League players
Russian expatriate footballers
Russian expatriate sportspeople in Spain
Expatriate footballers in Spain